In the run-up to the 2022 Serbian general election, various organisations carried out opinion polling to gauge voting intentions in Serbia. Results of such poll are displayed in this list. The date range for these opinion polls are from the previous presidential election, held on 2 April 2017, and the previous parliamentary election, held on 21 June 2020, to 3 April 2022.

Graphical summary

Parliamentary election

Presidential election

Poll results

Parliamentary election

2022

2021

2020

Presidential election

2022

2021

2017

Notes

References 

2022
Serbia